Tabb Street Presbyterian Church is a historic Presbyterian church located at Petersburg, Virginia. It was designed by architect Thomas Ustick Walter and built in 1843, in the Greek Revival style. It has stucco covered brick walls and features a massive Greek Doric order pedimented peristyle portico consisting of six fluted columns and full entablature.  It has two full stories and a gallery.  A three-story rear brick wing was added in 1944.

It was listed on the National Register of Historic Places in 1979.  It is located in the Petersburg Courthouse Historic District.

References

External links

Tabb Street Presbyterian Church, 21 West Tabb Street, Petersburg, Petersburg, VA: 7 photos and 10 data pages at Historic American Buildings Survey
Tabb Street Presbyterian Church Website 

19th-century Presbyterian church buildings in the United States
Presbyterian churches in Virginia
Churches on the National Register of Historic Places in Virginia
Greek Revival church buildings in Virginia
Churches completed in 1843
Buildings and structures in Petersburg, Virginia
National Register of Historic Places in Petersburg, Virginia
Historic American Buildings Survey in Virginia
Individually listed contributing properties to historic districts on the National Register in Virginia
1843 establishments in Virginia
Thomas U. Walter church buildings